On an Overgrown Path is a cycle of fifteen piano pieces written by Leoš Janáček and organized into two volumes.

Background
Janáček composed all his most important works for solo piano between 1900 and 1912. He probably began preparing his first series of Moravian folk melodies in 1900. At this time, the cycle had only six pieces, intended for harmonium: Our evenings, A blown-away leaf, The Frýdek Madonna, Good night!, The barn owl has not flown away! and a Piu mosso published after Janáček’s death. These melodies provided the basis for the first volume of On an Overgrown Path. Three of these compositions were first published in 1901 with the fifth volume of harmonium pieces, Slavic melodies, under the title On an overgrown path – three short compositions. By 1908 the cycle had grown to nine pieces, and was by then intended for piano instead of harmonium. The definitive version of the first book was published in 1911. On 30 September 1911, Janáček published the first piece of the second series in the Lidové noviny newspapers. The new series was created, in its entirety, around 1911. The complete second book was printed by the Hudební matice in 1942. The première of the work took place on 6 January 1905 at the "Besední dům" Hall in Brno.

Structure
Series I
 Naše večery (Our Evenings) (1900)
 Lístek odvanutý (A Blown-Away Leaf) (1900)
 Pojďte s námi! (Come With Us!) (1908)
 Frýdecká panna Maria (The Madonna of Frydek) (1900)
 Štěbetaly jak laštovičky (They Chattered Like Swallows) (1911)
 Nelze domluvit! (Words Fail!) (1908)
 Dobrou noc! (Good Night!) (1900)
 Tak neskonale úzko (Unutterable Anguish) (1911)
 V pláči (In Tears) (1908)
 Sýček neodletěl! (The Barn Owl Has Not Flown Away!) (1900)

Series II
 Andante (1911)
 Allegretto (1911)

Series II supplement (paralipomena) — not authorized by the composer for publication
 Più mosso (1900)
 Vivo (1900)
 Allegro (1911)

Earliest version / manuscript

After intensive studies of various sources, the German pianist Lars David Kellner published the first version of the 'overgrown path' on his 2013 Janacek album ('The complete original works for piano'), using the earliest sources for Book I and Janacek's original manuscript for Book II. Kellner also includes this version of the piano cycle in his recitals.

Arrangements
 For violin and piano, by Jan Štědroň, performed by Yuriko Kuronuma, Alfred Holeček
 For cello and piano, by Miloš Sádlo, performed by Miloš Sádlo, Alfred Holeček
 For cello and piano, by František Smetana, performed by František Smetana, Jiří Hubička
 For cymbalom, by Petr Oliva, performed by Petr Oliva
 For cymbalom, by Helena Červenková, performed by Helena Červenková
 For cymbalom, by Daniel Skála, performed by Daniel Skála
 For accordion, by Daniela Wagner, performed by Daniela Wagner
 For accordion, by Ivan Koval, performed by Ivan Koval
 For accordion, by Teodoro Anzellott, performed by Teodoro Anzellott
 For accordion and piano, by Stefan Heucke, performed by Marko Kassl, Tobias Bredohl
 For harp, by Chantal Mathieu, performed by Chantal Mathieu
 For guitar, by Martin Bresnick, performed by Benjamin Verdery
 For flute and guitar, by Jiří Jirmal and Miloslav Klaus, performed by Jan Riedlbauch, Miloslav Klaus
 For guitar quartet, by David Scarth, performed by York Guitar Quartet, David Ashworth, Andrew Forrest, John Mackenzie, David Scarth
 For guitar quartet, by Marek Velemínský, performed by Prague Guitar Quartet
 For guitar, keyboard and orchestra, by Jan Hála, performed by Lubomír Brabec, Jan Hála, Karel Vágner Orchestra, conducted by Karel Vágner
 For oboe quartet, by Zurich Oboe Quartet, performed by Zurich Oboe Quartet
 For wind ensemble, by Ronald Karten, performed by Netherlands Wind Ensemble
 For string quartet, by Jarmil Burghauser performed by Quartetto Energie Nove
 For string orchestra, by Jarmil Burghauser, performed by London Jupiter Orchestra, conducted by Gregory Rose
 For chamber orchestra, by Martin Bresnick, performed by the Saint Paul Chamber Orchestra, conducted by Christopher Hogwood
 For string orchestra, by Daniel Rumier, with texts by Maia Brami, performed by Camerata Zurich, Igor Karsko, director.

In popular culture
Some movements were used in the soundtrack for the 1988 American film The Unbearable Lightness of Being.

Notes

References
 Program notes by Dr. David Doughty for the two-CD album of Janáček's Piano Works (complete) played by Håkon Austbø (Brilliant Classics 92295)
 Leoš Janáček: Po zarostlém chodníčku Prague: Editio Bärenreiter, 2006. BA 9502. ISMN M-2601-0365-8
 Zahrádka, Jiří (preface): Janáček, Leoš : Po zarostlém chodníčku. Praha: Editio Bärenreiter Urtext, 2009. BA 9502. ISMN 979-0-2601-0461-7

External links
 

Compositions by Leoš Janáček
Compositions for solo piano
1901 compositions
1908 compositions
Suites (music)